is a city located in Ibaraki Prefecture, Japan. , the city had an estimated population of 76,218 in 32,714 households and a population density of 970 persons per km². The percentage of the population aged over 65 was 29.4%.

Geography
Ryūgasaki is located in southern Ibaraki Prefecture, in the low-lying flatlands south of Lake Kasumigaura. The Kokai River runs through the western part of the city, and the basin is dotted with tributaries and lakes. Lake Ushiku, despite its name, is entirely within the city of Ryūgasaki.

Surrounding municipalities
Ibaraki Prefecture
 Ushiku
 Tsukuba
 Inashiki
 Toride
 Tsukubamirai
 Kawachi
 Tone

Climate
Ryūgasaki has a Humid continental climate (Köppen Cfa) characterized by warm summers and cool winters with light snowfall.

Demographics
Per Japanese census data, the population of Ryūgasaki has recently plateaued after several decades of growth.

History
The name "Ryūgasaki" can be traced back to 1182 when the samurai clan ruling the territory adopted "Ryūgasaki" as their family name. The northern half of the city was an exclave of Sendai Domain during the Edo period, the region joined  in 1869 before merging with Ibaraki Prefecture in 1875. The southern portion of the city was part of Kitasōma District in Shimōsa Province, as the boundary between Shimōsa and Hitachi Province had been established in the Nara period as the Tone River. However, by the Meiji period, the course of the river had shifted, leaving the area of present-day southern Ryūgasaki on the northern bank of the river. This area was transferred to Ibaraki Prefecture in 1875

The town of Ryūgasaki was created with the establishment of the modern municipalities system on April 1, 1889.

In February 1955, the city grew to its present size when a proportion of  merged with the city.

In 1974, the city adopted the Swan, the Pinus, and Platycodon grandiflorus as its city symbols for bird, tree and flower respectively.

Government
Ryūgasaki has a mayor-council form of government with a directly elected mayor and a unicameral city council of 22 members. Ryūgasaki, together with neighboring Tone, contributes two members to the Ibaraki Prefectural Assembly. In terms of national politics, the city is part of Ibaraki 3rd district of the lower house of the Diet of Japan.

The current mayor is Kazuo Nakayama, who assumed the position on January 18, 2010. Nakayama is the seventeenth and eighteenth mayor of Ryūgasaki having been re-elected to hold the position again from January 18, 2014.

Economy

New Central Airlines, a commuter airline, is headquartered in the city, on the grounds of Ryūgasaki Airfield, although no commercial flights are scheduled from the city.

Education
 Ryutsu Keizai University 
 Ryūgasaki has 11 public elementary schools and six public middle schools operated by the city government. There are one public middle school and three public high schools operated by the Ibaraki Prefectural Board of Education as well as one private high school.

Transportation

Railway
 JR East –  Jōban Line
  
Kantō Railway - Ryūgasaki Line
  -  -

Highway

Airport
Ryūgasaki Airfield – however, no scheduled commercial services

Local attractions

Noted people from Ryūgasaki 
Isao Okano, judoka, Olympic gold medalist
Nana Suzuki, model
Kisenosato Yutaka, the 72nd yokozuna in sumo wrestling
Akiyo Noguchi, retired professional rock climber, olympic bronze medalist, seven-time IFSC Climbing World Cup champion

References

External links

Official Website 

Cities in Ibaraki Prefecture
Ryūgasaki, Ibaraki